Vinyl is the debut studio album by American country music singer William Michael Morgan. It was released on September 30, 2016, by Warner Bros. Nashville. The album has produced three singles, "I Met a Girl", "Missing" and "Vinyl". Morgan co-wrote two of the album's 11 tracks.

Commercial performance
Vinyl debuted at number five on the Top Country Albums chart, and number 65 on the US Billboard 200. The album has sold 30,600 copies as of July 2017.

Track listing

Personnel
Shannon Forrest - drums
Larry Franklin - fiddle
Paul Franklin - lap steel guitar, pedal steel guitar
Aubrey Haynie - fiddle, mandolin
Wes Hightower - background vocals
Brent Mason - electric guitar
William Michael Morgan - lead vocals
Gordon Mote - keyboards
Jimmy Ritchey - banjo, acoustic guitar, baritone guitar
Jimmie Lee Sloas - bass guitar
Ilya Toshinsky - banjo, acoustic guitar
Glenn Worf - bass guitar

Charts

References

2016 debut albums
William Michael Morgan albums
Warner Records albums
Albums produced by Scott Hendricks
Albums produced by Jimmy Ritchey